The following is a list of squads for each nation competing at the 2016 European Women's Handball Championship.

On 25 October 2016 every coach had to submit a list of a maximum of 28 players, whom which 16 will be selected for the final tournament. Up to three replacements were granted during the tournament. The final squads were released on 3 and 4 December 2016.

Age, caps and goals are correct of the start of the tournament, 4 December 2016.

Group A

Serbia
Head coach: Dragica Đurić

An 18-player squad was announced on 16 November 2016. The final squad was revealed on 2 December 2016.

Slovenia
An 18-player squad was announced on 10 November 2016. The final squad was revealed on 1 December 2016.

Head coach: Uroš Bregar

Spain
An 18-player squad was announced on 11 November 2016. The final squad was revealed on 28 November 2016.

Head coach: Jorge Dueñas

Sweden
The squad was announced on 1 November 2016. On 13 December 2016, Marie Wall replaced Olivia Mellegård because of an injury.

Head coach: Henrik Signell

Group B

France
A 19-player squad was announced on 8 November 2016. The final squad was revealed on 29 November 2016.

Head coach: Olivier Krumbholz

Germany
An 18-player squad was announced on 3 November 2016. A 21-player squad was revealed on 16 November 2016. The final squad was announced on 1 December 2016.

Head coach: Michael Biegler

Netherlands
A 17-player squad was announced on 4 November 2016. The final squad was revealed on 26 November 2016.

Head coach: Helle Thomsen

Poland
A 17-player squad was announced on 6 November 2016. The final squad was revealed on 28 November 2016.

Head coach: Leszek Krowicki

Group C

Czech Republic
A 19-player squad was announced on 7 November 2016. The squad was reduced to 18 players on 28 November 2016. The final squad was revealed on 2 December 2016.

Head coach: Jan Bašný

Denmark
The squad was announced on 9 November 2016.

Head coach: Klavs Bruun Jørgensen

Hungary
A 22-player squad was announced on 14 November 2016. It was reduced to 21 players on 20 November 2016, to 18 players on 24 November 2016, and to 17 players on 30 November 2016.

Head coach: Kim Rasmussen

Montenegro
A 20-player squad was announced on 14 November 2016. It was reduced to 17 on 30 November 2016.

Head coach: Dragan Adžić

Group D

Croatia
An 18-player squad was announced on 14 November 2016. The final squad was revealed on 3 December 2016.

Head coach: Goran Mrđen

Norway
The squad was announced on 8 November  2016.

Head coach: Thorir Hergeirsson

Romania
A 23-player squad was selected. It was trimmed to 18 on 28 November 2016.

Head coach: Ambros Martín

Russia
A 21-player squad was announced on 16 November 2016. It was reduced to 18 players on 3 December 2016.

Head coach: Yevgeni Trefilov

References

External links
Official website

squads
European Handball Championship squads